Sam and Amanda may refer to:
Sam and Amanda Fowler, a couple on the American soap opera Another World
Sam and Amanda Marchant, twin sisters on the British reality television show Big Brother